Garrett Nussmeier (born February 7, 2002) is an American football quarterback for the LSU Tigers.

Early life and high school
Nussmeier was born in Lake Charles, Louisiana and moved several times growing up due to his father's career as a football coach. He attended Edward S. Marcus High School in Flower Mound, Texas. Nussmeier passed 3,788 yards and 38 touchdowns in his junior season. As a senior, he passed for 2,815 yards with 33 touchdowns and five interceptions. Nussmeier committed to play college football at LSU over offers from Texas, Texas A&M, Miami, Georgia, Baylor, and North Carolina.

College career
Nussmeier played in four games as a true freshman before redshirting the season. Following the departure of Max Johnson from the team, LSU petitioned the NCAA to let him start the January 2022 edition of the Texas Bowl but still maintain his redshirt status, which was denied. Nussmeier finished the season with 29 pass completions on 57 attempts for 329 yards with two touchdown passes and two interceptions.

Personal life
Nussmeier's father, Doug Nussmeier, played college football at Idaho and in the NFL before entering coaching. Doug Nussmeier is currently the quarterbacks coach for the Los Angeles Chargers.

References

External links
LSU Tigers bio

Living people
American football quarterbacks
LSU Tigers football players
Players of American football from Texas
Year of birth missing (living people)
American people of German descent